Llantwit Major AFC are a Welsh football club formed in 1962 and are based in the town of Llantwit Major, Vale of Glamorgan, South East Wales. They currently play in the Cymru South, and in 2021–22 finished as league champions.

History
Llantwit Major Football Club was formed in 1962. A selection committee selected the team until entry to the South Wales Amateur League Second Division was gained in 1971. Life Member Gwyn John was appointed as the first team manager. Manager John's team were promoted to the 1st Division after finishing second in the 1976–77 season. Llantwit consolidated in the division before claiming their first Amateur League title under new manager Alan Foster in the 1979–80 season. This was closely followed by their second championship just a year later after retaining the title and adding the Corinthian Cup to achieve the double. This kick started a golden period in the 80's where the club won another double of league and Corinthian Cup in 1983–84. The hat-trick of Corinthian Cups came in the 1986–87 season. The club were also runners up in the league on a further two occasions during the decade. The 1990s by contrast was a very mixed period for the club, first relegation in 1991–92 under Rob Sherman's leadership, followed by promotion two years later with Steve Manning at the helm. Fast forward two years and relegation, this time with record appearance holder Pete Lingham as player/manager. However the club made sure they were in the first division again at the turn of the millennium, the management duo of Kev Pycroft and Phil Clay gaining promotion by winning a comfortable Second Division title. The club spent the next decade consistently flirting with the league title without ever looking like serious title contenders with Llantwit stalwarts Tim Watts and John Guy providing much needed stability in charge. The club also came runners up in the Corinthian Cup in 2005.  John Guy stepped down as manager in 2010 following a decade as manager to move upstairs as Chairman. Guy did this selflessly in order to allow the introduction of fresh ideas into the club from new boss Kevin Rees in partnership with Watts. Rees and Watts introduced flesh blood into the playing staff gaining instant success by lifting the SWFA Senior Cup in 2010–11. The bedrock of the new players was Darren Robinson who became player/coach/manager along with the irrepressible Watts.

Supporters and Rivalries

Llantwit Major supporters are known as the 'Windmill Army', and can draw crowds of up to 250 for important matches such as their 2018 title decider against STM Sports. For many years, the number one rival was St. Athan, however this rivalry has diminished due to Llantwit's rise through the leagues. Instead, Pen-Y-Bont FC have become the opposition most looked forward to by fans and players alike.

A rivalry has also developed with Ammanford AFC, which began when a Twitter video posted by the Llantwit Major Twitter account after a 3-1 victory left numerous players and supporters of the Ammanford side in tears. 

Meanwhile, the club has friendly links with Dutch club Feyenoord Rotterdam, Boca Juniors and Port Talbot Town.

Recent success (2016-onwards) 

Llantwit Major have enjoyed incredible success in recent years, rising from the amateur divisions to the second tier of Welsh football. Manager Karl Lewis has established a strong squad of players from the local area, many of whom have been playing together for their entire lives. The most notable success so far was lifting the Welsh Football League Division Two title in the 2017/18 season, in the club's first season at that level having been promoted from Division Three the season before. Former players Sam Snaith and Adam Roscrow have gone on to play in the Welsh Premier League with Cardiff Met, and the club also enjoyed a victory over Barry Town AFC – one of the biggest clubs in Wales. The Windmill Lane stadium has also seen improvements, with the addition of a new seating area and concrete standing areas, as well as improvements to the bar and clubhouse.

Following a 4 - 3 victory over Pontypridd Town, Karl Lewis announced he would leave the club at the end of the season. Darren Robinson was announced as his replacement shortly after.

Cymru South 2019–20 

For the 2019–20 season, Llantwit were inaugural members of the Cymru South. A number of improvements were made to the ground and pitch to be ready for the campaign, with the highlight being the addition of a new main stand.

Llantwit finished the season in 11th place, with the final standings determined on a points per game basis due to the coronavirus crisis. This meant Llantwit finished clear of relegation and would once again be in the second tier the following season. The highlight of the season was the return of former Manager Karl Lewis, who had overseen the most successful period in the history of the club.

Cymru South 2021–22 
With the 2020–21 campaign cancelled due to the impact of the covid 19 pandemic, Llantwit once again remained in the Cymru South. Far from the relegation battle they were predicted to endure, Llantwit led the table for much of the 2021–22 season, and were crowned champions on 18th April 2022, following a 3-1 victory away at Undy Athletic. It was an outstanding campaign for the Major, beating almost every team in the league at least once, with Swansea University FC the only exception.

Cymru South 2022–23 
Before the 22/23 season, manager Karl Lewis decided to leave the club to become an assistant at Briton Ferry FC. He took seven current Llantwit players with him, leaving the club with a significant rebuild. New manager Stevie Campbell-McCarthy was quickly appointed, who went to work bringing in new players. 

Former manager Lewis would continue to raid the club, taking a total of 15 former Llantwit players with him during the course of the season. Despite this, new signings such as Matt Kimmins and Paolo Marenghi enabled Llantwit to be in a decent position at the halfway point of the season, overcoming a poor start to the campaign to sit mid table.

Honours 
Cymru South – Champions: 2021–22
FAW Senior Cup Winners – 2010–11
Welsh Football League Division Two Champions – 2017–18
Welsh Football League Division Three Champions – 2016–17
South Wales Amateur League Division 1 Champions – 1979–80, 1980–81, 1983–84, 2011–12
South Wales Amateur League Division 2 Champions – 1998–99
Corinthian Cup Winners – 1980–81, 1983–84, 1986–87
Barry & District League Division 2 Champions – 1984–85
Bridgend & District League Premier Division Cup Winners – 1998–99
Bridgend & District League Division 1 Champions – 1990–91
Bridgend & District League Division 1 Challenge Shield Winners – 1992–93
Supporters Cup Winners – 2010–11 
Mr Blobby Cup - 2022

References

External links
 Old Pitchero Website
 Official Website
 'That's not Llandudno' - fictional novel based on Llantwit Major AFC

Football clubs in Wales
Association football clubs established in 1962
Welsh Football League clubs
Cymru South clubs
South Wales Amateur League clubs